The Tanzania Public Service College (TPSC), an institution of higher learning in Tanzania, mandated to offer courses that prepare school leavers for effective delivery of public service to the citizens of the country. The institution also offers refresher courses to active public servants, to improve and update their knowledge-base and skills.

Location
The College has six campuses at the following locations: Mtwara, Singida,  Tanga, Mbeya, Tabora and Dar es Salaam. The main campus in Dar es Salaam is along Bibi Titi Mohammed Street, in the Upanga East neighborhood. The geographical coordinates of the Dar es Salaam campus are:06°48'54.0"S, 39°16'51.0"E (Latitude:-6.815000; Longitude:39.280833).

Overview
Tanzania Public Service College was established to support public service department on training, consultancy and research in order to meet customers' satisfaction.  Tanzania Public Service College is running some projects in various discipline in order to improve the quality of service. Some of the project are conducted with some supports from donors like CINOP. Cinop has done a lot to make sure that TPSC through participatory approach is adapting CBET (Competence Based Education Training). TPSC is registered  as a Technical College in which Public Service Departments will have practical oriented staffs graduated from TPSC. In doing so CINOP has participated fully in the process of Improving ICT infrastructure, like Computer Labs and Information Resource Centre. Under this project, TPSC is the first institution in Africa to use a Dutch Computer application to manage computers systems known as ResPowerfuse. Also TPSC is using IGEL technology. So TPSC is making efforts to make sure that staff are competent to deliver the service and to utilize the available resources.

Academic programmes
The college offers certificates, diplomas and bachelors degrees in various disciplines, including the following:

References

External links
 Tanzania Public Service College Website

Education in Tanzania
Universities and colleges in Tanzania